Florida's 72nd House District elects one member of the Florida House of Representatives. Its current representative is Republican Fiona McFarland. This district is located in the Sarasota metropolitan area and encompasses northwestern parts of Sarasota County. As of the 2010 census, the district's population is 159,167. The most populated census-designated place in the district is its share of  Sarasota, with around 54,400 people living there; followed by  Sarasota Springs (16,400 people) and  Fruitville (13,300 people). In the 2020 Florida House of Representatives election, a total of 100,519 people voted in the general election between Republican Fiona McFarland and Democrat Drake Buckman. However, it is estimated that about 134,018 (84.2% of the district's total population) people are eligible to vote.

Representatives from 1972 to the present

References 

72